Kalabeyr is a town in the northeastern Nugal region of Somalia, near Garowe City.

References
Qori Xabaalan

Populated places in Nugal, Somalia